Pacino or Pecino da Nova (late 14th century) was an Italian painter active in a late Gothic art style around Bergamo.

His father Alberto and brother Pietro were also painters.  Few works can be attributed to him with any certainty, including works for the Duomo of Bergamo, the Basilica of Santa Maria Maggiore of Bergamo, and some frescoes for the Oratory of Santa Maria di Mocchirolo in Brianza He is said to have been influenced in coloring by Antonello da Messina
.

References

Year of death unknown
Year of birth unknown
14th-century Italian painters
Italian male painters
Painters from Bergamo
Trecento painters
Gothic painters